Deba is a railway station in Deba, Basque Country, Spain. It is owned by Euskal Trenbide Sarea and operated by Euskotren. It lies on the Bilbao-San Sebastián line.

History 
The station opened in 1893 as part of the Elgoibar-Deba stretch of the San Sebastián-Elgoibar railway.

Services 
The station is served by Euskotren Trena line E1. Trains (in both directions) run every hour throughout the week.

References

External links
 

Euskotren Trena stations
Railway stations in Gipuzkoa
Railway stations in Spain opened in 1893